= Church of Nuestra Señora de la Luz, Puebla =

Church in Puebla, Mexico

Church of Nuestra Señora de la Luz
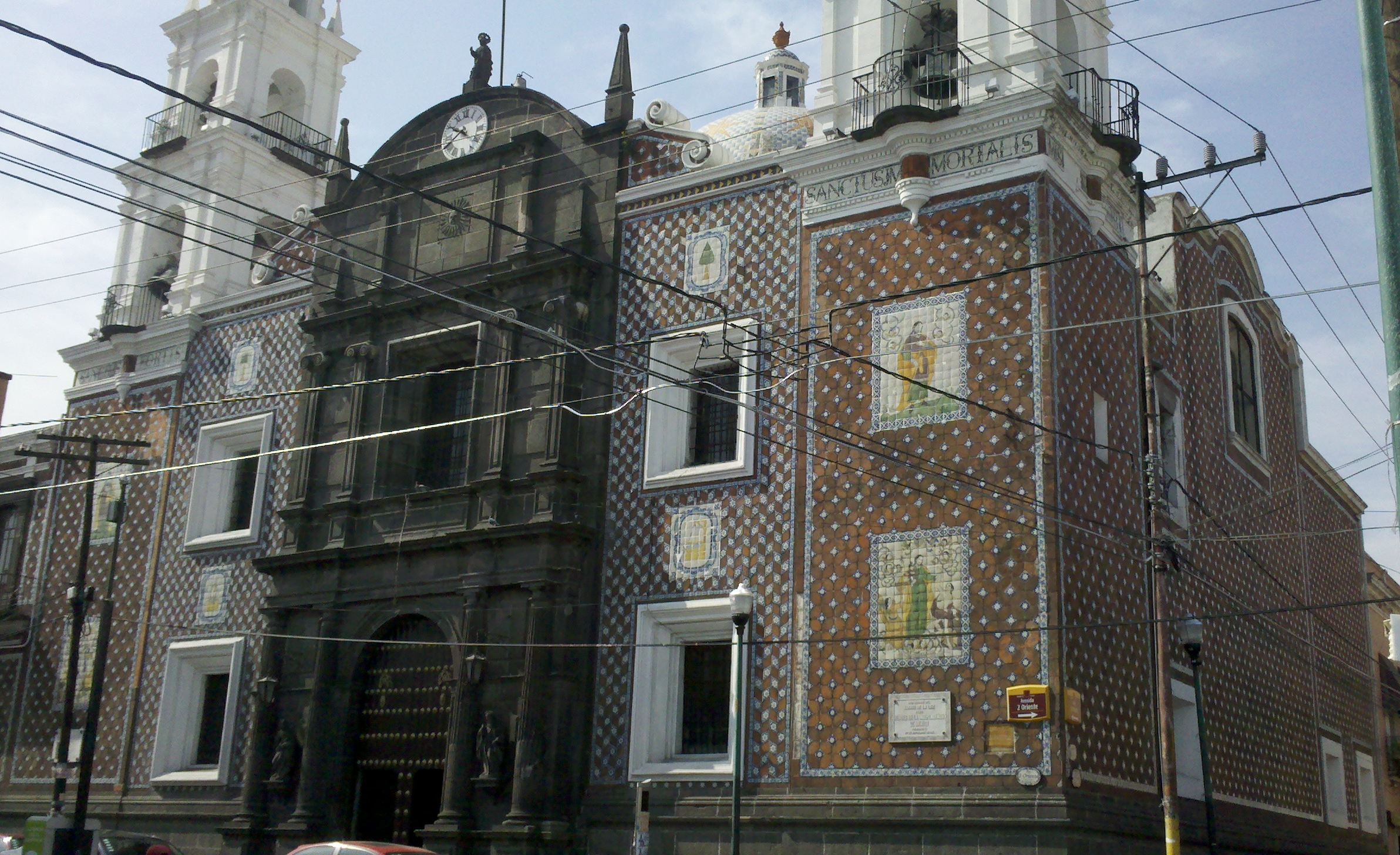
- Exterior in 2014

- Location within Mexico

Location
- Interactive map of Church of Nuestra Señora de la Luz
- Coordinates: 19°2′27″N 98°11′24″W

Iglesia de Nuestra Señora de la Luz, or simply Iglesia de la Luz, is an historic church in the city of Puebla, in the Mexican state of Puebla.

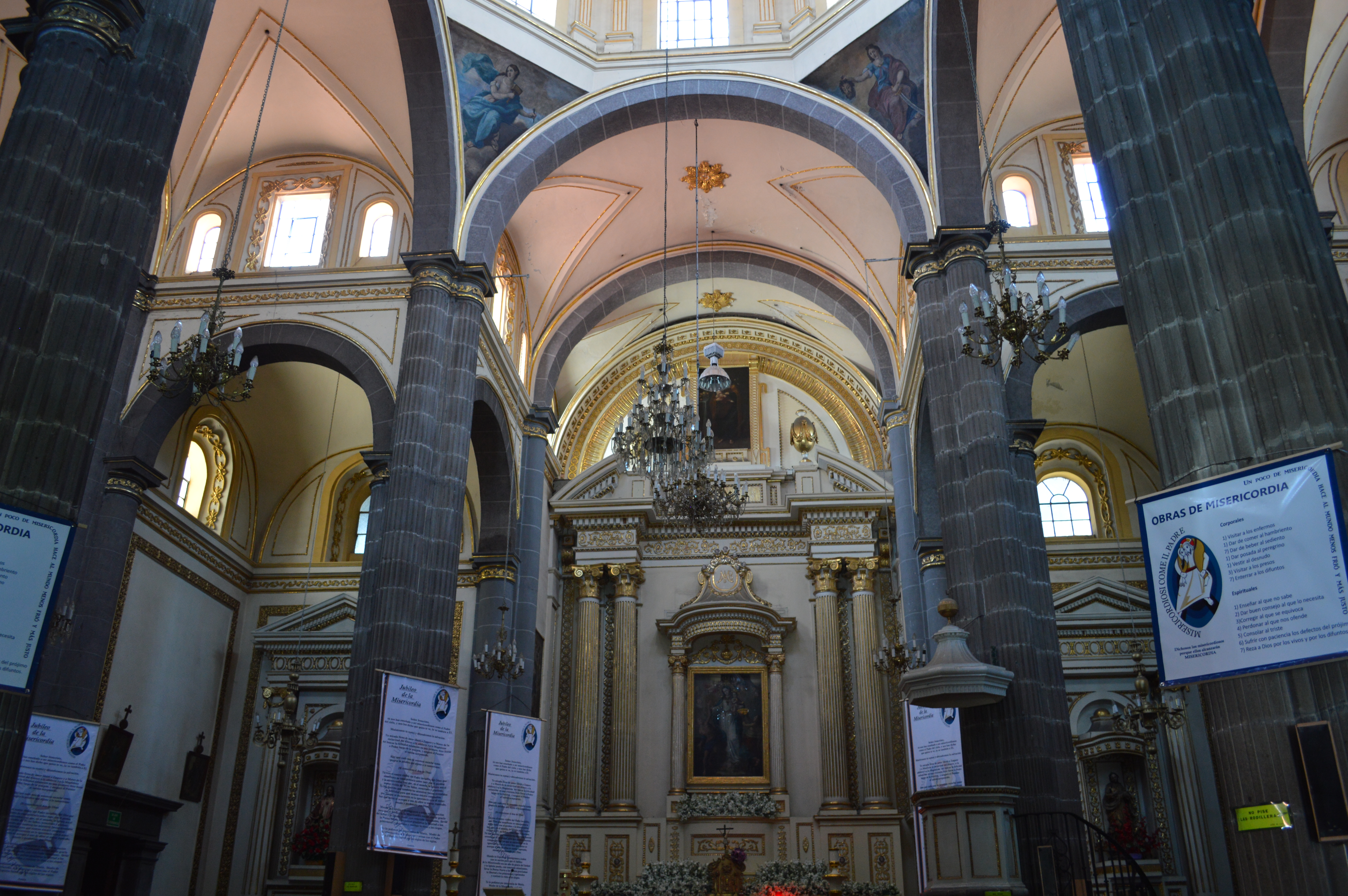
The church's interior in 2016
